The Pakistan national cricket team toured England and Ireland from 3 July to 7 September 2016 for a four-match Test series, a five-match One Day International (ODI) series and a one-off Twenty20 International (T20I) against the England cricket team. They also played two three-day matches against Somerset and Sussex prior to the Test series, a two-day match against Worcestershire during the Test series, and two ODI matches against Ireland prior to the ODI series.

England's ODI matches against Pakistan was the first to trial a system where the TV umpire calls the front-foot no-ball, instead of the on-field umpire. During the third ODI match of the series, England set a new record team total when they scored 444 runs, with Alex Hales setting a new individual total for an England batsman when he scored 171.

The Test series was drawn 2–2, England won the ODI series 4–1, and Pakistan won the one-off T20I match by 9 wickets. The fixtures formed part of a points-based scoring system, which was introduced in their series against Sri Lanka in May 2016. England won the Super Series 16–12.

England

Squads 

† Toby Roland-Jones was dropped from the England Test squad after James Anderson and Ben Stokes were recalled for the 2nd Test. David Willey was initially ruled out of the ODI series after suffering an injury in the final of the 2016 NatWest t20 Blast, with Jake Ball named as his replacement. However, Willey's injury was not as serious as first thought, with him rejoining the squad, with Ball also retaining his place. Mohammad Irfan was ruled out of the T20I squad and was replaced by Hasan Ali.

Tour matches

First-class: Somerset vs Pakistanis

First-class: Sussex vs Pakistanis

Two-day: Worcestershire vs Pakistanis

Test series

1st Test

2nd Test

3rd Test

4th Test

ODI series

1st ODI

2nd ODI

3rd ODI

4th ODI

5th ODI

T20I series

Only T20I

Ireland

Squads

ODI series

1st ODI

2nd ODI

References

External links
 Series home at ESPNCricinfo

2016 in Pakistani cricket
2016 in English cricket
2016 in Irish cricket
International cricket competitions in 2016
Pakistani cricket tours of England
Pakistani cricket tours of Ireland